William Levy (January 10, 1939 – April 22, 2019), also known as the Talmudic Wizard of Amsterdam, was an American writer, editor, and former radio personality, plus the author of such works as The Virgin Sperm Dancer, Wet Dreams, Certain Radio Speeches of Ezra Pound and Natural Jewboy.

Before leaving the U.S. in the autumn of 1966 aboard the R.M.S Queen Mary, Levy attended the University of Maryland, College Park and Temple University, and taught in the literature department at Shippensburg State College, in Pennsylvania. 

In the Sixties and Seventies, he was founder and chief editor of many magazines, including the Insect Trust Gazette, International Times, Suck, and The Fanatic. Later, he served as European Editor for American glossy magazines High Times and Penthouse, and as an associate editor of Amsterdam zines Het Gewicht, Ins & Outs, La Linea and Atom Club. Levy was a regular contributor to Andrei Codrescu's Exquisite Corpse and Libido. He also published his own Transactions of the Invisible Language Society series. His meditation play Europe in Flames was also featured at the Festival of New Radio in New York. In 1998, Levy was awarded the Erotic Oscar for writing at London's Sex Maniac's Ball. For 20 years until his retirement from radio, Levy's alter-ego, Dr. Doo Wop, could be heard weekly spinning groovy music across Amsterdam's airwaves.

Until his death following a long illness, Levy lived in Amsterdam with his wife, the literary translator Susan Janssen (translator of many works of Charles Bukowski and of F. Scott Fitzgerald's The Great Gatsby).

Selected works
Playing Tennis with Kafka
Have Rock Will Roll
Confessions of a Failed Dealer
France: Oxygen, a Thirsty (American-in-Paris) Satori
Refugee TV
A Call for Chaos & Beans On Toast, Please!
Poetry and Pensees
Three Poems
Dear George W Bush
The Virgin Sperm Dancer
Wet Dreams
Certain Radio Speeches of Ezra Pound
Souvenir Programme for the Official Lynching of Michael Abdul Malik (with John Michell)
Jeremiad Chants
Natural Jewboy (Ins & Outs Press, Amsterdam, 1981)
Voicings and Transmissions
Radio Art
Blood
Rape
An Introduction to Political Porno in Europe
A Vilna Legend
The Night Before Charisma
Billy's Holiday
Viagra Blues
Is There Sex Over Forty?
Impossible: The Otto Muehl Story (New York: Barany Artists, 2001)
Never Knew Never From Less: Secondary Raw Materials of Harry Hoogstraten
ZOCK: The Outlaw Manifesto of the Century
Death of a Gunslinger: An Obituary on Ed Dorn for America

Hanging Out With Zalman Shneour
Two Mornings in Amsterdam Pt. 1 Lost Soles
Fourth and Fifteen & A Poet's Guide to Fashion
The Beast of Britain Minstrel Show
The Fortunate Traveller (2019)

External links
Levy on Michell An interview with William Levy about John Michell
Dr. Doo-wop A film by Michiel Brongers
 Definitive biopic by Malcolm Hart
William Levy. RIP Obituary in International Times (April 27, 2019)
William Levy, R.I.P. Obituary in Straight Up Arts Journal (April 27, 2019)

References

1939 births
American male journalists
University of Maryland, College Park alumni
Temple University alumni
Shippensburg University of Pennsylvania faculty
American expatriates in the Netherlands
American male poets
2019 deaths